Chal Baghcheh-ye Zilayi (also Romanized as Chāl Bāghcheh-ye Zīlāyī; also known as Chalbaghcheh) is a village in Zilayi Rural District, Margown District, Boyer-Ahmad County, Kohgiluyeh and Boyer-Ahmad Province, Iran. At the 2006 census, its population was 230, in 45 families.

References 

Populated places in Boyer-Ahmad County